Poznań County is a unit of territorial administration and local government (powiat) in Greater Poland Voivodeship, west-central Poland. It came into being on January 1, 1999, as a result of the Polish local government reforms passed in 1998. Its administrative seat is the city of Poznań, although the city is not part of the county (it constitutes a separate city county). The county's administrative offices (starostwo powiatowe) are in the Jeżyce neighbourhood of Poznań.

Composition, Area and Population

As of 2012 its total population is 341.357, out of which the urban population is 132,048 (Swarzędz 29,894, Luboń 26,935, Mosina 12,150, Murowana Goślina 10,140, Puszczykowo 9,311, Kostrzyn 8,539, Pobiedziska 8,329, Kórnik 6,981, Buk 6,181, Stęszew 5,339), and the rural population is 209,309.

Neighbouring counties
Apart from the city of Poznań, Poznań County is also bordered by Oborniki County and Wągrowiec County to the north, Gniezno County and Września County to the east, Środa Wielkopolska County to the south-east, Śrem County and Kościan County to the south, Grodzisk Wielkopolski County and Nowy Tomyśl County to the west, and Szamotuły County to the north-west.

Administrative division
The county is subdivided into 17 gminas (two urban, eight urban-rural and seven rural). These are listed in the following table, in descending order of population.

Demographics

Map

Finances
At the 5th European Congress of Councils in Kraków in 2019, the county was nationally awarded as best financially prudent among urban councils. A year later they came second.

In announcing 2021 budget they foresaw an annual income of 408,379,127.79zł and an expenditure of 446,379,127.79zł, leaving a deficit of 38,000,000.00zł which will be covered through its credit.

References

External links
Polish official population figures 2006

 
Land counties of Greater Poland Voivodeship